= Khar Mazgaon =

Village in India

Coordinates: 18°22′15″N 72°56′13″E

Khar Mazgaon is a village in Raigad district, Maharashtra, India.
